Romagne-sous-Montfaucon (literally Romagne under Montfaucon) is a commune in the Meuse department in Grand Est in north-eastern France.
The Commune is home to the Romagne '14-'18 museum of WWI artifacts

Nearby is the  American Battle Monuments Commission's Meuse-Argonne American Cemetery for US military killed during the First World War.

See also
Communes of the Meuse department

References

External links
 American Battle Monuments Commission website for Meuse-Argonne American Cemetery
 Romagne '14-'18 Museum

Romagnesousmontfaucon